is a cultivar of tangor. It is a citrus hybrid of a hybrid of Kiyomi and Encore (Kiyomi–Encore No. 5) and Murcott tangor.

Description
The fruit can be easily peeled by hand. It has a sugar content of between 12% and 13%, with some fruits reaching 15%. It fruits in late January. It does not produce pollen, so it must be pollinated by another species of citrus.

Its systematic name is  after Kuchinotsu, Nagasaki where it was bred. It was hybridized in 1984, with its name registered in 2004 and the variety registered in 2005. The first fruits came on sale in 2007.

References

External links

Citrus hybrids
Japanese fruit